Dong-hyun, also spelled Dong-hyeon, is a Korean masculine given name. It has been a popular name for a few decades. In 1980, Dong-hyun was the eighth-most popular name for baby boys in South Korea, while in 1990 it came in ninth place. In the early 2000s it rose even higher in popularity, but then fell back down again. In 2008, 1,571 South Korean baby boys were given the name "Dong-hyun", making it the tenth-most popular name.

Hanja
The meaning of the name Dong-hyun differs based on the hanja used to write each syllable of the name. There are eight hanja with the reading "dong" and seven hanja with the reading "hyun" among the Basic Hanja for educational use, and another 25 with the reading "dong" and 36 with the reading "hyun" in the Table of Hanja for Personal Name Use as of December 2018.

 Dong:    
 Hyun:

People
People with this name include:

Entertainers
Shin Dong-hyun (born 1979), stage name MC Mong, South Korean hip hop artist
Kim Dong-hyun (actor) (born 1989), South Korean singer, member of Boyfriend
Seo Dong-hyeon (born 1991), stage name Samuel Seo, musician
Kim Dong-hyeon (born 1994), stage name Gong Myung, South Korean actor and singer, member of 5urprise
Lim Dong-hyun (born 1995), stage name Lee Do-hyun, South Korean actor
Kim Dong-hyeon (born 1998), stage name MC Gree, South Korean rapper and actor
Kim Dong-hyun (singer, born 1998), South Korean singer, member of MXM and AB6IX

Footballers
Cho Dong-hyun (born 1951), South Korean football player and manager
Jang Dong-hyun (born 1982), South Korean football forward
Kim Dong-hyun (footballer, born 1984), South Korean football forward
Seo Dong-hyeon (born 1985), South Korean football forward
Yang Dong-hyun (born 1986), South Korean football striker
Lee Dong-hyun (footballer) (born 1989), South Korean football forward
Hong Dong-hyun (born 1991), South Korean football midfielder
Do Dong-hyun (born 1993), South Korean football midfielder

Other sportspeople
Dong Hyun Kim (born 1981), South Korea mixed martial artist
Lee Dong-hyun (born 1983), South Korean baseball player
Kim Dong-hyun (bobsleigh) (born 1987), South Korean bobsledder
Jung Dong-hyun (born 1988), South Korean alpine skier
Im Dong-hyun (born 1989), South Korean archer
Shin Dong-hyen (born 1989), South Korean artistic gymnast
Kim Dong-hyeon (luger) (born 1991), South Korean luger

Other
Yun Tong-hyon, North Korean politician, member of the 7th Central Committee of the Workers' Party of Korea

See also
List of Korean given names

References

Korean masculine given names